Jollof derby is the moniker given to any encounter between the national football teams of Nigeria and Ghana. The derby takes its name from the nations' long-standing rivalry over who makes the best Jollof rice. The sport has been played since prior to both countries' respective independence, and the match-up is among the oldest and most proliferate rivalries in African football. The football competition reflects the long-standing socio-economic rivalry between the two nations, which are two of the five Anglophone nations in West Africa and home to the largest populations in the region.

The two sides often meet in African Cup of Nations (AFCON) tournaments, Olympic games, and WAFU tournaments. Apart from the AFCON Final, it is one of Africa's most important national football matches and one of the most watched annual sporting events. The rivalry is considered one of the most intense in sports. This high-octane match has seen remarkable goal celebrations from both teams, with the opposition frequently mocked.

Ghana leads Nigeria in competitive match head-to-head results with 25 victories and 19 draws. Nigeria has had more success at the World Cup, with a total of 21 points since their debut in 1994 in the United States. Ghana has accumulated 19 points since their first appearance at the tournament in Germany in 2006.

History 
The first official encounter between the two was a World Cup qualifier in 1960, according to FIFA. Both national teams, however, had already competed in several domestic friendlies and competitions against foreign nations since 1950. Both of these West African countries' national teams were created when they were still British protectorates. The modern nation of Ghana was then known as the Gold Coast, and players of the Nigerian squad donned scarlet tops over white shorts and were known as the "Red Devils" before adopting their national colors of green and white. 

The Gold Coast Football Federation, established in 1920, was more than two decades older than Nigeria's, and its team was more well-known among Britain's colonies. The Gold Coast national team had already toured England, playing friendly matches against various clubs, prior to what is commonly considered to be the first official International "A" match in 1951. Nigeria, not to be outdone, followed suit, albeit with less success. Despite their disparate histories, Nigeria was able to defeat their fledgling opponents 5–0 at home.

For the rest of the 1950s, the two teams were fairly evenly matched, generally swapping victories on their own turfs, but Ghana would go on to dominate the tournament between the 1960s and the early 2000s, winning the Africa Cup of Nations four times to Nigeria's two. Meanwhile, Nigeria would have more success in intercontinental play, qualifying for the FIFA World Cup many times and reaching the greatest FIFA ranking in Africa of No. 5 in the world in 1994. In both that year and 1998, the team made historic trips to the knockout stages, defeating Spain and coming within minutes of overcoming world superpower and eventual 1994 finalists Italy.

Regional Cup era 
Until 1960 Egypt was the only African nation to ever participate in FIFA World Cup qualifying.  Since decolonization had yet to begin in earnest, few nations on the African continent were able to assemble national teams that were internationally recognized and thus eligible for FIFA competitions. Various rivalry cups and tournaments were instituted instead. During the 1950s and 1960s, Nigeria and Ghana would compete in three cup competitions.

1951–59 Jalco Cup 

There are various records of matches having been played between the national teams dating back to 1938. These unofficial matches list the scores and winners but, as with the match in 1938, specific details such as player lineups and often even the exact date that the match took place, are unknown. The first well-documented matches were organized under the banner of the Jalco Cup, a competition sponsored by the Ford Motor Company by way of a subsidiary, Joe Allen & Company (J.Allen & Co.)  for whom the cup was named.  It is generally held to be the beginning of the rivalry's historical record. The cup was contested between the two countries every year except 1952.

1959–67 Dr Kwame Nkrumah Gold Cup 
After Ghanaian independence the country's football officials harbored ambitions of competing in the Olympic Games. To this end they met with officials from the most prominent West African nations, including Nigeria, to create the West African Soccer Federation. The aim of the new federation was to sponsor a regional football tournament which would help to raise the level of the game in the respective nations for future participation in international tournaments. The result was the Dr. Kwame Nkrumah Gold Cup, also called the West African Soccer Federation championship.

The tournament had middling success; it was plagued from the outset by organizational and funding shortfalls. In the initial tournament in 1959, the qualifying stages were only partially completed. In addition, Nigeria did not appear for the semifinal of that tournament, and the match had to be replaced with an exhibition game played as a stand-in.  Also, the fourth and final tournament in 1967 was postponed following issues having to do with the lack of lighting during the qualifying matches and subsequent complaints on the issue by the Sierra Leone players. There is no record of the final tournament ever having been completed.

Despite these issues, the tournament would see two matches played between Ghana and Nigeria, the high point being when the two sides met in the final of the 1960 tournament in Lagos, Nigeria in which Ghana won 3–0. Both matches played between the two sides during the life of the tournament were won by Ghana by a combined score of 8–0.

1961–67 Azikiwe Cup 
The figurative successor to the Jalco Cup, the Azikiwe Cup was named for Dr. Nnamdi Azikiwe, who was Nigeria's first postcolonial president. The tournament was initially contested under the same rotating, single match, format as the Jalco Cup, but was later switched to an aggregate home and away setup with each team hosting one match apiece.

Unlike the Jalco Cup, the teams did not share the cup in the event of a tie under the single leg format, but rather the cup returned to the nation that had held it. This only occurred in 1962 when Ghana secured a 0-0 result in Lagos and were able to retain the cup that they initially won in the competition in 1961. Ghana won or retained the cup in every year that it was contested, continuing a dominance in the rivalry stemming in the early 1960s broken only during a brief period in the mid-1970s and 1980s and lasting until early 2000s.

Honours

Statistics

Overall 

Nigeria and Ghana have played 56 times in all tournaments, including friendly matches. Ghana has defeated Nigeria 25 times, with Nigeria winning only 12 of the matches. On 19 occasions, matches between the two have finished in a tie. Nigeria has had more success at the World Cup, with a total of 21 points since their debut in 1994 in the United States. Ghana has accumulated 19 points since their first appearance at the tournament in Germany in 2006. Nigeria's 21 points were earned over six competitions, whereas Ghana's 19 were earned in just three. After reaching the quarterfinals in South Africa in 2010, Ghana has progressed further in a World Cup than Nigeria. Nigeria has only ever advanced to the second round three times, in 1994, 1998, and 2014.

List of matches 

* Ghana was organized under the Gold Coast Football Federation from this time until its independence
Table lists only senior team competitions.  Olympics, underage competition and African Nations Championship matches are excluded
Matches which go which are won after extra time with penalty kicks are listed as draws, per official FIFA designation.

References

External links
 Details at 11v11.com
 History of Jalco Cup 1951-1959 - RSSF.com
 History of Dr. Kwame Nkrumah Cup 1959-1967 - RSSF.com
 History of Azikiwe Cup 1961-1967 - RSSF.com

International association football rivalries
Ghana national football team
Nigeria national football team
Ghana–Nigeria relations